Cochylis sierraemaestrae is a species of moth of the family Tortricidae. It is found on Cuba.

The wingspan is about 11 mm. The forewing ground colour is yellowish cream suffused with ferruginous, especially at the wing base and beyond the end of the median cell. There are brown dots along the costa and dorsum. The markings consist of broad chestnut-brown fascia. The hindwings are pale brownish grey.

Etymology
The species name refers to the Sierra Maestra mountain range.

References

Moths described in 2007
Cochylis
Endemic fauna of Cuba